Tim Orr (born 1968) is an American cinematographer known mostly for his work with director David Gordon Green.

Orr graduated from the North Carolina School of the Arts in 1998. He has worked as the Director of Photography on such films as George Washington, Raising Victor Vargas, All the Real Girls, Undertow, Trust the Man, Year of the Dog, Snow Angels, Choke, Pineapple Express, Sex Drive, and Observe and Report.

Filmography

Awards
Stockholm Film Festival Best Cinematography Award (2000) and Independent Spirit Award nomination (2001) for George Washington; Independent Spirit Award nomination (2004) for Dandelion.

References

External links
 Tim Orr at the Internet Encyclopedia of Cinematographers
 
 

1968 births
American cinematographers
Living people
University of North Carolina School of the Arts alumni
People from North Carolina
Date of birth missing (living people)